Located at Six Corners in the Portage Park neighborhood of Chicago's Northwest Side, the Portage Theater is one of the oldest movie houses in Chicago. The Portage Theater opened on December 11, 1920 as the Portage Park Theatre (the former name is still visible on the building's facade). Built for the Ascher Brothers circuit with 1,938 seats, the Portage was the first theater built specifically for film (and not vaudeville) in the area.

The Portage Theater's interior features a megaphone-shaped auditorium based on a formal Beaux-Arts opera house design. When the theater was taken over by Balaban and Katz in 1940, its marquee, entrance lobby and foyer were redecorated in a sleek, streamlined art deco style to complement other prominent art deco designs at Six Corners such as Sears department store and the Klee Brothers building.

The Portage remained a popular fixture of the neighborhood, becoming a second-run movie house in the 1960s. In the 1980s, the theater underwent a dramatic change when a wall was constructed down the middle of the existing auditorium, resulting in two oddly-shaped cinemas. The Portage was shuttered in 2001 after operating sporadically for the previous couple years. The theater was restored and renovated, and reopened after a five-year hiatus in the spring of 2006 as a single-screen, 1300-plus seat theater showing both silent and sound classic motion pictures as well as hosting other live events.

Today the historic Portage Theater is the home of the Silent Film Society of Chicago and hosts the Chicago Silent Film Festival as well as portions of the Chicago Polish Film Festival. In addition, the interior of the theater was utilized extensively in late May 2008 for filming of scenes for the film Public Enemies which is based on the life of 1930s bank robber John Dillinger. The interior of the Portage was reportedly used as a stand-in for the Biograph Theater on Lincoln Avenue, where Dillinger viewed his last movie before being fatally wounded by FBI agents upon exiting the theater.

References

External links
 http://www.theportagetheater.com//
 "Celluloid, Graft & Puppies: The (Abbreviated) Portage Theater Story": Detailed history of the theater and its building on Gapers Block

Art Deco architecture in Illinois
Cinemas and movie theaters in Chicago
Concert halls in Illinois
Chicago Landmarks
Music venues in Chicago
Polish-American culture in Chicago
Theatres completed in 1920
Theatres in Chicago
Public venues with a theatre organ